Pusia ivanmarrowi is a species of sea snail, a marine gastropod mollusk, in the family Costellariidae, the ribbed miters.

Distribution
This species occurs in Western Australia (state).

References

ivanmarrowi